SN 1998S was a type IIn supernova that was observed in NGC 3877 in March 1998. SN 1998S was the brightest type IIn event observed
.

It was discovered on 1998 March 2.68 UT in NGC 3877 by Z. Wan at a broadband (unfiltered) optical magnitude of +15.2.

Its spectrum showed prominent H and He emission lines with narrow peaks and broad wings, superimposed on a blue continuum. These narrow lines indicate the presence of a dense circumstellar medium (CSM) in the vicinity of the supernova. The high luminosity of SN1998S is due to the interaction of fast material (ejecta) with previously-expelled slowly-expanding material (CSM), which can more effectively convert kinetic energy of ejecta into radiation energy.

References

External links
 Light curves and spectra  on the Open Supernova Catalog
 Simbad
 http://www.astro.utoronto.ca/DDO/research/DDOSNe.html

Supernova remnants
Supernovae
Ursa Major (constellation)
Astronomical objects discovered in 1998